Cold Driven was a hard rock band from Armstrong, British Columbia, Canada. The band expressed passion for creating unique and original music. The band recorded their debut album, "Set In Stone" in 2005 which helped establish themselves in the music industry.

In 2007, the band recorded and released "Steel Chambers" their second studio album. The first single "Heavier Than Heaven" rose to number 51 on the Canadian rock charts. The band began extensive touring across Canada in 2008, attempting to solidifying a strong fan base across the country. With this album the band earned a spot in top 5 of the Vancouver Fox Seeds competition.

The Band has recently decided to stop playing music.

Band members
 Billy Nickell – vocals
 Dennis Nickell – vocals/bass
 Benjamin Bouthillier – guitar
 Shane Bouthillier – guitar
 Jeremy McLachlan – drums

Previous band line-up

 Billy Nickell – vocals
 Dennis Nickell – vocals/bass
 Benjamin Bouthillier – guitar
 Bryn Bird – guitar
 Shane Bouthillier – drums

Album Releases

Set In Stone (2005)

Film Score
Breaking Condemnation
Shackles
Don't You Know
In Stone
Bittersweet Casualty
Life Like That
Wheels Of Change
5 Minutes Unconscious
Same Old Skies
Slipping Away

Steel Chambers (2007)

Steel Chambers
Heavier Than Heaven
Hide And Seek
Cries Become The Silence
We Carry On
Sweet Lies
Cruel Intentions
I Stand Corrupted
The Crutch
Worthy Among The Worthless
March Out Of Line

The Wicked Side of Me EP (2011)

Intro
Kingdom Come
The Wicked Side of Me
Now That I'm Gone
Straight For Disaster
In This Cold
Rise of The Broken

References

Musical groups established in 2005
Musical groups from British Columbia
Canadian post-grunge groups
Musical groups disestablished in 2011
2005 establishments in British Columbia
2011 disestablishments in British Columbia